The Ayr Mountains are a mountain range in Karkaraly District, Karaganda Region, Kazakhstan.

The Pavlodar Region border stretches at the feet of the northern slopes of the range. The Zhosaly Sanatorium is located on the northwestern side of the highest mountain of the Ayr chain.

Geography   
The Ayr Mountains are part of the Kazakh Upland system (Saryarka). It is a range of moderate altitude located to the north of lakes Saumalkol and Karasor. The mountains mark the northern limit of the wide plain where Karasor and its neighboring lakes lie, stretching alongside the southern slopes of the range. The Kyzyltau massif lies off the northeastern end of the range and the Semizbughy to the north of the northwestern slopes.

The soil of the mountains is dark brown. River Ashchysu has its sources in the range and flows below its northern slopes.

Flora
Steppe vegetation grows on the slopes, including wormwood, sedges, fescue and alpine oatgrass. In protected valleys there are clumps of birch, wild rose and hawthorn.

See also
Geography of Kazakhstan

References

External links
Sanatorium Zhosaly
Республика Казахстан Павлодарская область г. Экибастуз
Могильник Сангыру-1 — Қарағанды Мәдениет
Kazakh Uplands